The 1999 San Jose State Spartans football team represented San Jose State University as a member of the Western Athletic Conference (WAC) during the 1999 NCAA Division I-A football season. Led by third-year head coach Dave Baldwin, the Spartans compiled an overall record of 3–7 with a mark of 1–5 in conference play, placing seventh in the WAC. San Hose State played home games at Spartan Stadium in San Jose, California

Schedule

Coachign staff

Game summaries

at LSU

at Colorado

Saint Mary's

Tulsa

at Stanford

at TCU

at Rice

SMU (Cancelled)

at UTEP

Hawaii

at Fresno State

References

San Jose State
San Jose State Spartans football seasons
San Jose State Spartans football